was a Japanese industrialist and businessman whose company, Toyo Kogyo, led to the founding of the present-day multinational automaker Mazda Motor Corporation, in 1984.

Early life
The son of a fisherman, Matsuda was born in Hiroshima in 1875. He was apprenticed to a blacksmith in Osaka at the age of 14 and invented the "Matsuda-type pump" in 1906. He later took over management of the foundry at which he apprenticed and changed the name of the organization to "Matsuda Pump Partnership"; he was eventually forced out of the company, but launched an arms manufacturing company soon after: the eponymously-named Matsuda Works. Matsuda would see his fledgling company's fortunes improve when it was commissioned as a supplier to the Tsar of Russia and as the manufacturer of the Type 99 rifle for the Imperial Japanese Armed Forces.

Toyo Kogyo and Mazda Motor Corporation
By 1921, Matsuda had accumulated significant wealth owing to his previous business ventures.

World War II and aftermath 
In August 1945, the Toyo Kogyo headquarters in Hiroshima sustained heavy damage in the atomic bombing of Hiroshima, which was carried out by the United States against Imperial Japan in the closing stages of World War II.

During the Allied occupation of Japan, Matsuda was not accused nor formally charged of being a war conspirator, and a revitalized Toyo Kogyo was the main driving force behind repairing the damaged economy of Hiroshima in the aftermath of World War II. In 1950, Toyo Kogyo provided the start-up for a baseball team, the Hiroshima Carp.

His adopted son-in-law, Tsuneji Matsuda, succeeded him as president of Toyo Kogyo and oversaw the expansion of its automobile division until 1979, when Ford Motor Company took a 25 percent equity stake.

The alliance with Ford Motor Company led to the divestiture of shares from the Matsuda family and the change of Toyo Kogyo into Mazda Motor Corporation in 1984; the Matsuda family still owns a controlling interest in the Hiroshima Toyo Carp.

Matsuda died on 27 March 1952. For his contributions to Hiroshima Prefecture, a bronze statue of him was created in 1965 by Onomichi-native sculptor Katsuzou Entsuba, and was erected at the Hijiyama Park in Minami-ku.

References

1875 births
1952 deaths
Japanese founders of automobile manufacturers
People from Hiroshima
Mazda